Cambodia competed in the 2018 Asian Games in Jakarta and Palembang, Indonesia from 18 August to 2 September 2018. This event marks the 12th Asian Games appearance for Cambodia since making their debut in 1954.

Cambodia will make its debut in the sport of sailing at the Asian Games. 

Taekwondo practitioner Sorn Seavmey, was the country's flag bearer during the opening ceremony.

Medalists

The following Cambodia competitors won medals at the Games.

|  style="text-align:left; width:78%; vertical-align:top;"|

Competitors 
45 athletes have been qualified to compete in 13 different sporting events. A total of 43 athletes attended the Games released by the Olympic Council of Asia.

Athletics 

Cambodia entered five athletes (1 men and 4 women's) to participate in the athletics competition at the Games.

Canoeing

Sprint

Qualification legend: QF=Final; QS=Semifinal

Fencing 

Individual

Gymnastics 

Cambodia represented by Choeun Sokden who participate in the men's vault event, but he did not start the competition.

Jet Ski 

Cambodian jetskier, Saly Ou Moeut, took home the gold medal in the ski modified event of the 2018 Asian Games at Ancol, North Jakarta, on 25 August. Ou Moeut also won another bronze medal in the Runabout 1100 stock. Ou Moeut became the first male athlete of Cambodian who won gold medal since debut in Asian Games in 1954.

His teammate, Mustan, failed to win any medal because of engine problem during Moto 1. But he still performed well in other rounds.

Ju-jitsu 

Cambodian athlete Jessa Khan won the gold medal in the women's ju-jitsu newaza 49 kg at the 2018 Asian Games after beating United Arab Emirates athlete Mahra Alhinaai by submission at JIExpo Kemayoran, Jakarta, on 24 August.

Men

Women

Judo 

Men

Karate 

Cambodia entered the karate competition with two men's athletes.

Sailing 

Cambodia set up 3 men's sailors to make their debut at the Asian Games.

Men

Mixed

Soft tennis

Swimming 

Men

Women

Taekwondo

Cambodia entered their athletes (3 men's and 3 women's) into the taekwondo competition at the Games.

Poomsae

Kyorugi

Wrestling 

Cambodia put up five wrestlers (2 men's and 3 women's) competed in the freestyle event at the wrestling competition.

Men's freestyle

Women's freestyle

See also 
 Cambodia at the 2017 Asian Indoor and Martial Arts Games
 Cambodia at the 2018 Asian Para Games

References 

Nations at the 2018 Asian Games
2018
Asian Games